Big Creek Canyon is a canyon on the Chilcotin River, located around the confluence of Big Creek in the Chilcotin District of British Columbia, Canada.

See also
Big Creek Provincial Park
Lava Canyon
Farwell Canyon

References

Canyons and gorges of British Columbia
Landforms of the Chilcotin